Zhivkov is a Bulgarian masculine surname; its feminine counterpart is Zhivkova. It may refer to:
Todor Zhivkov (1911–1998), Bulgarian head of state
Lyudmila Zhivkova (1942–1981), Bulgarian Communist Party functionary, daughter of Todor 
Hristo Zhivkov (born 1975), Bulgarian actor
Nikola Zhivkov (1847–1901), Bulgarian educator

Bulgarian-language surnames